Bardeh may refer to:
 Bardeh, Chaharmahal and Bakhtiari (بارده - Bārdeh)
 Bardeh, Kerman (بارده - Bārdeh)
 Bardeh, Razavi Khorasan (برده - Bardeh)